Aziz Pasha Vrioni (1859–1920) was an Ottoman-Albanian politician of the early 20th century. He was a member of the Ottoman Parliament representing Berat, and Albanian Minister of Finance and Minister of Agriculture and of Mines.

He was born in Berat, Ottoman Empire, member of the influential and well-known Vrioni family. Aziz Pasha Vrioni got involved in the Albanian preparations in the eve of the Albanian Declaration of Independence in 1912. He carried over various ministries of the Albanian governments after.
During the turmoils of 1914 he organized his men into local militia, fighting against the Islamic Peasant Rebels and Greek insurgents. After failing to defend Lushnja, he was shortly arrested by the government of Turhan Pasha Përmeti, accusing him of conspiracy and collaboration with the rebels.
In October 1914, he joined the government of Essad Pasha Toptani in Durres and was elected General Director of the Administration.

Political activity 
 Representative of the Kaza of Berat in the Ottoman Parliament: 16 November 1908
 Prefect of Berat, Albania: November 1912 – 1913
 Minister of Finance of Albania: (Took over from Abdi Toptani in October 1913) 22 January 1914 - 17 March 1914
 General Director of the Albanian Administration: October 1914 - January 1915
 Minister of Agriculture and Mines of Albania: March 1914 - May 1914
 Minister of Public Works of Albania: May 1915 - January 1916

References

Albanian activists
Albanian Pashas
Albanians from the Ottoman Empire
19th-century Albanian politicians
20th-century Albanian politicians
People from Berat
People from Janina vilayet
Government ministers of Albania
Finance ministers of Albania
Public Works ministers of Albania
Aziz
1859 births
1920 deaths